The 2005–06 season of the Philippine Basketball League (PBL).

2005-06 Heroes Cup

Magnolia and Rain or Shine makes it to the finals via two-game sweep in their best-of-three semifinal series against Granny Goose and Harbour respectively, the Wizards won over Tortillos, 98-97 in overtime in Game One and repeated with another double overtime win in the second game, 92-86. The Painters edged Harbour, 69-67, in their semifinals opener, and they wrapped up the series with a 69-59 triumph in Game Two.

Finals

Magnolia overcame a 0-2 series deficit, the Wizards pulled away from a 56-all deadlock in the final three minutes of the deciding fifth game, a 9-0 run, with Arwind Santos hitting a triple, gave Magnolia a 65-56 advantage with 1:23 remaining, the Painters remain scoreless and allowed the Wizards to pad their lead to 16 points, 73-57. Kelly Williams of Magnolia was voted the finals MVP.

2006 Unity Cup

Sixth-seeded Harbour advances to the finals with a 3-1 series win over Montaña. In the other semifinal series, Toyota-Otis scored a 3-0 sweep over defending champion Rain or Shine.

Finals

Joseph Yeo fired seven three-pointers and scored a game-high 28 points as Harbour captured its first PBL title. The Portmasters drilled in 36 points from the three-point area and five of those triples came in the opening of the fourth period that opened up a 68-57 lead against the Sparks heading into the final 4:50. LA Tenorio of Harbour Centre was awarded with the finals MVP.

Individual awards
Unity Cup 
 Finals MVP: LA Tenorio (Harbour Centre)
Most Valuable Player: Joe Devance (Toyota-Otis)
Mythical First Team:
Jayson Castro (Hapee-PCU)
J.R. Quiñahan (Granny Goose)
Joe Devance (Toyota-Otis)
Jojo Tangkay (Rain or Shine) 
Kelly Williams (Magnolia Ice Cream)
Mythical Second Team:
Arwind Santos (Magnolia Ice Cream)
Marvin Ortiguerra (Rain or Shine)
Alex Compton (Montana)
Ken Bono (Montana)
Al Magpayo (Montana)

References

External links
 www.philippinebasketball.ph

Philippine Basketball League seasons
2005–06 in Philippine basketball
PBL